Colombo is the largest city and commercial capital of Sri Lanka.

Colombo may also refer to:

Places 
 Colombo (crater), lunar crater
 Colombo Airport (disambiguation), two airports that serve Colombo, Sri Lanka
 Colombo District, administrative district which includes Colombo, Sri Lanka
 Colombo, Paraná, Brazil
 Colombo, medieval name of Kollam, Southern India

People 
 Colombo (surname)
 Christopher Columbus, as Cristoforo Colombo is known in English
 Colombo crime family, an American crime family based in New York

Organizations 
 Colombo Dockyard, ship building company in Sri Lanka
 Colombo FC, professional football club in Sri Lanka
 Colombo Plan, South-Asian economic development organization
 Colombo Yogurt, American company

Other uses 
 Colombo (herb)
 Colombo (horse), British Thoroughbred racehorse
 Bagalini Colombo, Italian ultralight aircraft design
 MV Colombo Express, container ship
 Operation Colombo, an operation undertaken by the Chilean secret police

See also
 Columbo, a television show and its titular character, sometimes mistakenly spelled "Colombo"